Gallany may refer to:

Gallany, County Londonderry, a townland in County Londonderry, Northern Ireland
Gallany, County Tyrone, a townland in County Tyrone, Northern Ireland